Hyde Park (formerly Third Swamp Reserve) is an inner-city park in Perth, the state capital of Western Australia.

Electricity is available, which is used, for example, to power temporary fairground rides.

Locality 
Hyde Park is in the City of Vincent. It has a lake feature in the middle which is separated into two basins. The park is popular with people walking around, weddings, picnics and barbeques. The park has 17 zones that are available to hire for events.

Hyde Park Fair 
The Hyde Park Fair is held annually in the park, and is one of Perth's longest running free community events. The event was originally known as the Hyde Park Festival, and was first held in 1968. The Festival ended in 1985, but was resurrected in 1988 as the Hyde Park Fair, run by the Rotary Club of North Perth.

History 

Prior to European settlement, the area was known to the local Noongar people as Boodjamooling. The area was originally approximately midway along a series of wetlands that stretched from Claisebrook Cove through to Herdsman Lake and included Lake Monger. The lakes and the area in which they resided were collectively known as the Great Lakes District.  Today, only a small proportion of those wetlands remain.

After the establishment of the Swan River Colony in 1829, the European settlers gave it the name Third Swamp. In 1897,  of Third Swamp was gazetted as a public park by Lyall Hall and two years later renamed Hyde Park.

Hyde Park Lakes Restoration Project 
During the late 1980s, a significant level of public concern began to develop on various fronts relating mainly to the environmental health of the lakes, along with the reduction in aesthetics and negative effects to the local flora and fauna.

The lakes act as a stormwater compensation basin and have been naturally recharged via groundwater seepage and stormwater run-off. The lakes were adversely affected by a changing weather pattern, hotter summers and low rainfall turning them into a sludgy swamp during the summer. This in conjunction with the pressure on scarce and finite water resources meant that a long-term viable engineered solution was required to maintain a water body year round. 

After thorough investigation, a master plan was developed and the Hyde Park Lakes Restoration Project was completed in June 2012. The works help ensure the lakes provide a pristine environment year round with the addition of endemic plant species thereby providing a better habitat for the wildlife. 

The existing lake wall was repaired and retained and a new lower lake wall was constructed to reduce the lakes' overall surface area by approximately 15%, designed to reduce recharge volumes and allow for better management. 

Vegetated "beach" areas were constructed (one at the causeway corner of each lake) and planted with native vegetation to assist in removing nutrients from the lake water and to address the once stagnant areas of the lakes where rubbish accumulated.

Flora and fauna

Sloping grass areas run down to two central groundwater lakes. Shade is provided by mature introduced trees:

 Plane Trees - around the lakes
 Moreton Bay Figs  - lawn area
 Port Jackson Fig - lawn area
 Pines - around the boundary
 Jacarandas - south-east corner
 Unusual tree species: swamp cypress, red cedar, bunya pine
 Remnant indigenous tree species: Eucalyptus and Melaleuca

There are about 300 southwestern snake-necked turtles living in the park.

Several iconic plantings have occurred in Hyde Park over the years, including the avenue of plane trees surrounding the lakes that were planted between 1897 and 1899, and the grove of jacarandas in the south east corner of the park in 1921. More recent times have seen the establishment of two native garden beds on the northern side of the park around a stand of original jarrah trees.

References

External links

Parks in Perth, Western Australia
State Register of Heritage Places in the City of Vincent
Vincent Street, North Perth
William Street, Perth